In psychophysical perception, the Coriolis effect (also referred to as the Coriolis illusion) is the misperception of body orientation and induced nausea due to the Coriolis force. This effect comes about as the head is moved in contrary or similar motion with the body during the time of a spin, this rotation of the head affects the semicircular canals within the ear which causes a sense of dizziness or nausea before equilibrium is restored after the head returns to a stabilized state.

History 
Coriolis force was discovered by Gaspard-Gustave de Coriolis in 1832. By the end of the nineteenth century, Coriolis force had become a common phrase in meteorological literature. Coriolis force is classified as a fictitious force that is applied to objects that are in rotation. When applied to perception, this occurs when a person's head is moved out of alignment during a spin. If individuals are spinning to the left along their y-axis and then push their head forward, that will bring their heads out of alignment and make it subject to Coriolis force and resultant effect. The manifestation of this effect is that the individuals will feel like their heads are tilting to their left. This can cause nausea, disorientation, and motion sickness. These feelings of discomfort arise in the body when the signals being sent by the vestibular system and visual system are not in agreement, i.e. the eyes may be telling the body that one is not moving, but the vestibular system's fine-tuned senses are detecting and communicating the opposite.

In the real world 
The Coriolis effect is a concern for pilots, where it can cause extreme disorientation. This happens as pilots accelerate their aircraft and also need to check their instruments, which often involves moving their heads. This is particularly dangerous for an airborne pilot because it can give the feeling that they are pitching, yawing, and rolling simultaneously. In extreme situations, this can cause the pilot to lose control of the aircraft.

See also
 Dizziness
 Equilibrioception
 Sensory illusions in aviation

References

Further reading
See, for example, Pouly and Young.

Psychophysics